David Rogerson Williams (March 8, 1776November 17, 1830) was a representative in the United States Congress and the 45th governor of South Carolina from 1814 to 1816.

Early life and career
Born in Darlington County in the Province of South Carolina, Williams was educated at schools in Wrentham, Massachusetts, and attended Rhode Island College until he withdrew in 1795. Nonetheless, after studying law he was admitted to the bar in 1797 and he practiced law in Providence, Rhode Island, for three years. Williams returned to South Carolina and became an editor of the Republican papers City Gazette and Weekly Carolina Gazette of Charleston. In 1803, Williams moved to Darlington County to engage in cotton planting and various manufacturing enterprises.

Political career
Williams was elected to the United States House of Representatives in 1804 from the 3rd congressional district as a Democratic-Republican. In general, Williams was a political maverick who stressed the need for limited government while also having greater accountability to the voters. When Williams first arrived in Washington D.C., he was offered to have dinner with President Thomas Jefferson, but Williams refused because he felt that it might interfere with his independence of mind. To let the voters know how their money was being spent, Williams requested an itemization of appropriation bills rather than a lump sum, but the House voted against an itemization.

As an ardent Nationalist, Williams left the House in 1813 to participate in the War of 1812 and was appointed by President James Madison as a brigadier general in the U.S. Army. He resigned in 1814 because of personal reasons and was involved in agriculture until his election later that year as Governor of South Carolina for a two-year term by the General Assembly.

Later life and career
After leaving the governorship in 1816, Williams returned to Darlington County to resume his planting and manufacturing operations. He was elected in 1824 to the South Carolina Senate and served until his accidental death while superintending the construction of a bridge over Lynchs Creek on November 17, 1830. Williams was interred on Plumfield Plantation near Society Hill.

References

External links 
SCIway Biography of David Rogerson Williams
NGA Biography of David Rogerson Williams
United States Congress Biography of David Rogerson Williams

1776 births
1830 deaths
Brown University alumni
19th-century American newspaper publishers (people)
Governors of South Carolina
University of South Carolina trustees
South Carolina state senators
Democratic-Republican Party members of the United States House of Representatives from South Carolina
Democratic-Republican Party state governors of the United States
People from Darlington County, South Carolina